Samad Bhat (born 2 October 1995) is an Indian cricketer who plays for Jammu & Kashmir. He made his first-class debut on 1 October 2015 in the 2015–16 Ranji Trophy.

References

External links
 

1995 births
Living people
Indian cricketers
Jammu and Kashmir cricketers
People from Srinagar